Sowing the Wind is a 1916 British silent romance film directed by Cecil Hepworth and starring Henry Ainley, Alma Taylor and Stewart Rome. It is based on the play Sowing the Wind by Sydney Grundy.

Cast
 Henry Ainley as Tom Brabazon 
 Alma Taylor as Rosamond  
 Stewart Rome as Ned Annersley  
 Violet Hopson as Helen Gray  
 Chrissie White as Maude Fretwell  
 Lionelle Howard as Bob Watkin  
 Charles Vane as Lord Petworth  
 Percy Manton as Sir Richard Cursitor

References

Bibliography
 Goble, Alan. The Complete Index to Literary Sources in Film. Walter de Gruyter, 1999.

External links

1916 films
1910s romance films
British romance films
British silent feature films
Films directed by Cecil Hepworth
British films based on plays
Films set in England
Hepworth Pictures films
British black-and-white films
1910s English-language films
1910s British films